The Center is the fifth tallest skyscraper in Hong Kong, after International Commerce Centre, Two International Finance Centre (88 storeys), Central Plaza and Bank of China Tower. The center is one of the few skyscrapers in Hong Kong that is entirely steel-structured with no reinforced concrete core and is one of the tallest steel buildings in world. It is located on 99 Queen's Road Central in the Central, roughly halfway between the MTR Island line's Sheung Wan and Central stations.

Background

The center is notable for its arrangement of hundreds of neon lights arranged as bars in increasing frequency towards the top of the building, which slowly scroll through the colours of the spectrum at night. During the Christmas season, the building's neon arrangement follows a festive motif and resembles a Christmas tree.

The English name of the building uses the American spelling "The Center" despite the vast majority of similarly named buildings in Hong Kong using the spelling "Centre" as a result of Hong Kong English's British origins. The direct translation of the Chinese name of the building is "Central Centre" or the "centre of Central", even though the building is in fact near the boundary of Central and Sheung Wan (Wing Kut Street).

The building was a project involving the Land Development Corporation since it was required to demolish many old buildings and lanes. The premises of The center is of irregular shape because surrounding lots within Queen's Road Central, Jubilee Street, Des Voeux Road Central and Gilman's Bazaar were already redeveloped. Various lanes and streets including Gilman Street, Wing On Street, Tung Man Street, Hing Lung Street, and Tit Hong Lane were shortened.

The elevator system is notable; users wishing to reach the upper floors of the building must make several lifts changes before they can do so. One set of lifts to go from the ground floor to the 6th floor; a second set of lifts from the 6th floor to the 42nd floor and then another set to the floors above. 

In addition, several historical structures were demolished from the project.  Many cloth shops located on Wing On Street, also known as Cloth Alley, were moved to the Western Market while Eu Yan Sang, a traditional Chinese medicine shop, was moved near the Stag Building to continue business.

In November 2017, it was announced that The Center was sold for HK$40.2 billion, making it the world's most expensive real estate transaction for a single building. It was reported that Li Ka-shing's CK Asset Holdings sold the building to a BVI company called CHMT Peaceful Development Asia Limited, which is thought to be led by state-owned China National Petroleum Corporation.

See also
 List of tallest buildings in Hong Kong
 List of buildings and structures in Hong Kong
 List of tallest freestanding steel structures
 List of tallest freestanding structures

References

External links 

 
 
 
 Transport Links to The Center
 15 Most Outstanding Projects in Hong Kong - The Center

Central, Hong Kong
Office buildings completed in 1998
Postmodern architecture
Skyscraper office buildings in Hong Kong